Strathmiglo (Ordnance Survey ) is a village and parish in Fife, Scotland on the River Eden. It lies on the old A91 road from Milnathort to Cupar and St. Andrews but was bypassed by a new road to the north in the 1970s. Nearby settlements include Auchtermuchty and Falkland.

History
Strathmiglo is sometimes thought to have belonged to the Mormaers of Fife in early times. Before 1350 it had become the centre of the shire of Strathmigloshire. It became a burgh of barony in the 16th century, by which time it belonged to the Scotts of Balwearie. Prior to the Reformation it was the site of a Collegiate church. Strathmiglo Town House was completed in 1734.

The economic life of the burgh in early times was linked to nearby Falkland Palace. In the 18th and 19th centuries the textile industry was important, as was boot-making in the 20th. There is a Pictish stone by the cemetery. It probably dates from the 9th century and shows a pair of legs (with toes) and stomach above. The upper torso and head are missing as the upper part of the stone is broken and missing. An accompanying plaque describes it as a carving of "a tuning fork".

Demography
The civil parish has a population of 1,274 (in 2011).

People from Strathmiglo
The Rev. David Williamson, author of "Lectures on Civil and Religious Liberty".

Also, the American country singer-songwriter Johnny Cash and his daughter Rosanne Cash are descended from ancestors originating in Strathmiglo.

References

External links

 Strathmiglo & Gateside community website
 Strathmiglo in the Second Statistical Account of c. 1845
 Strathmiglo at the Gazetteer of Scotland

Villages in Fife
Parishes in Fife